"Raised on Rock" is the second single from the seventeenth studio album "Sting in the Tail" of the German rock band Scorpions.
The song achieved a great placement on the charts worldwide and became known as one of the greatest hits in the 2010s which is #2 on the Classic Rock Mediabase chart.

Track listing

Raised on Rock

Personnel
Scorpions
 Klaus Meine - lead vocals
 Matthias Jabs - lead guitar
 Rudolf Schenker - rhythm guitar
 Paweł Mąciwoda - bass guitar
 James Kottak - drums

References

Scorpions (band) songs
2010 singles
2010 songs
Songs written by Klaus Meine
Sony Music singles